The 2003 San Francisco Giants season was the Giants' 121st season in Major League Baseball, their 46th season in San Francisco since their move from New York following the 1957 season, and their 4th season at Pacific Bell Park.  The Giants entered the '03 season as defending National League champions, aiming to get back to the World Series and win it. They finished in first place in the National League West with a record of 100 wins and 61 losses. They lost the National League Division Series in four games to the Florida Marlins, marking the 2003 Giants a failed season.

Offseason
November 15, 2002: Tsuyoshi Shinjo was released by the San Francisco Giants.
December 7, 2002: Marquis Grissom signed as a free agent with the San Francisco Giants.
December 7, 2002: Ray Durham was signed as a free agent with the San Francisco Giants.
March 18, 2003: Clay Bellinger was signed as a free agent with the San Francisco Giants.

Regular season

The Giants only played 161 games.  One game (at New York Mets) was postponed due to the Northeast Blackout of 2003 and was not rescheduled as it had no playoff implications.

Ray Durham and Benito Santiago became the first pair of Giants teammates to homer in each of the team's first two games of a season since at least 1901.

On June 23 against the Los Angeles Dodgers, Barry Bonds stole second in the 11th inning, the 500th steal of his career.  He became the first major leaguer to collect 500 home runs and 500 stolen bases in a career.

Opening Day Starters
 J.T. Snow
 Ray Durham
 Rich Aurilia
 Edgardo Alfonzo
 Barry Bonds
 Marquis Grissom
 Jose Cruz Jr.
 Benito Santiago
 Kirk Rueter

Season standings

National League West

Record vs. opponents

Roster

Player stats

Batting

Starters by position 
Note: Pos = Position; G = Games played; AB = At bats; H = Hits; Avg. = Batting average; HR = Home runs; RBI = Runs batted in

Other batters 
Note: G = Games played; AB = At bats; H = Hits; Avg. = Batting average; HR = Home runs; RBI = Runs batted in

Pitching

Starting pitchers 
Note: G = Games pitched; IP = Innings pitched; W = Wins; L = Losses; ERA = Earned run average; SO = Strikeouts

Other pitchers 
Note: G = Games pitched; IP = Innings pitched; W = Wins; L = Losses; ERA = Earned run average; SO = Strikeouts

Relief pitchers 
Note: G = Games pitched; W = Wins; L = Losses; SV = Saves; ERA = Earned run average; SO = Strikeouts

2003 National League Division Series

The Giants lost to the Florida Marlins in the NLDS.
Game 1 – Florida 0, San Francisco 2
Game 2 – Florida 9, San Francisco 5
Game 3 – San Francisco 3, Florida 4
Game 4 – San Francisco 6, Florida 7

This was the last playoff series that the Giants lost before winning 11 straight, a streak that ended in the 2016 Division Series against the Chicago Cubs.

Awards and honors
 Barry Bonds, National League Most Valuable Player
 Marquis Grissom CF, Willie Mac Award
All-Star Game
 Barry Bonds
 Jason Schmidt

Farm system

References

External links
 2003 San Francisco Giants at Baseball Reference
 2003 San Francisco Giants at Baseball Almanac

San Francisco Giants seasons
San Francisco Giants Season, 2003
San Francisco Giants Season, 2003
National League West champion seasons
San Fran